I Spit on Your Grave 2 is a 2013 American rape and revenge horror film directed by Steven R. Monroe. It is a standalone sequel to the 2010 film I Spit on Your Grave, also directed by Monroe, which in turn was based on Meir Zarchi's 1978 film of the same name.

The film was given a limited theatrical release at one theater, and was also received negatively by critics. It is also the only film in the franchise not to feature an American cast, or the series main protagonist Jennifer Hills.

It was followed by I Spit on Your Grave III: Vengeance Is Mine (2015).

Plot
Missouri-born model Katie Carter lives in New York City, working a part-time day job as a restaurant receptionist to make ends meet. Desperate to update her modeling portfolio, she answers an advertisement offering a free photography session. She then meets three Bulgarian siblings, photographers Ivan, Nicky and Georgy, who becomes infatuated with Katie. She leaves the photoshoot after disagreeing with Ivan about a topless shot. At Katie's apartment Georgy apologizes for Ivan and hands her a flash drive containing her photos.

That night, Katie wakes to find Georgy filming her, so she shocks him in self-defense. Georgy binds, gags and sodomizes her. Katie's neighbor, Jayson, tries to stop the rape but Georgy stabs and kills him. Nikolay and Ivan arrive and clean up all evidence of the crime. Ivan then force-feeds Katie ketamine, rendering her unconscious.

Katie wakes and finds herself naked and handcuffed to a pipe in a basement as the brothers relentlessly rape and torture her. She overpowers Georgy and escapes, but discovers that she is now in an unknown city. When she approaches Bulgarian police, she is taken into safe custody by Detective Kiril, who informs her that she has been kidnapped and taken to Sofia, Bulgaria‘s capital city. After an interview, Detective Kiril hands her over to Ana, who claims to be from a rape crisis center but is really Nikolay and Georgy's mother. Katie is returned to the basement and Valko, a friend of the family's father, electroshocks her genitals then brutally rapes her, leaving her bloodied. Ivan then beats her.

Katie is then placed in a box with her crucifix necklace and Valko's electroshock gun and buried alive. The ground beneath the makeshift coffin breaks and she falls into the sewer system below. Naked and hungry, Katie makes her way through the tunnels to a nearby church convent where she takes food and is soon found by its rector, Father Dimov, who recognizes her as a rape survivor. He gives her food, clothing, and a Bible. Katie approaches the U.S. Embassy, but leaves before going inside. Back at the church, Dimov offers support. As Katie goes back to the sewers, she leaves her Bible open for Dimov to read. After reading the passage "vengeance is mine", Dimov realizes that Katie seeks revenge against her rapists.

Katie first steals money from Ana's house and buys clothes, weapons, and supplies. She lures Georgy into the sewers, captures him and hangs him by his arms on the wall. She tortures him with a large switchblade and smears fecal matter into his wounds to cause infection, then leaves him  to die slowly. Meanwhile, Dimov contacts Kiril and informs him of Katie's condition and her intention to seek revenge on her attackers, and Kiril realizes that she is still in trouble. Both men aim to stop Katie from committing crimes and to persuade her that she would have legal justice. At a nightclub, Katie laces Nikolay's drink with ecstasy. He runs to the bathroom where she drowns him in an unflushed toilet. The next day, Valko sees Katie during a church service and chases after her into the basement where Katie strikes him with a rock. When he regains consciousness, he is strapped to a metal bed frame. Katie electroshocks his genitals with a stun stick, puts a large plumber's snake into his mouth, turns it on and it snakes its way down into his throat. She then attaches electrical cables to the bed and rooter and electrocutes him.

Ana discovers the burglary, but Katie pushes her into the sewers and binds her to watch Georgy die. Ivan realizes that Katie has escaped; she captures him, ties him to a table and tortures him by crushing his testicles until it bursts out violently. Kiril hears Ivan and Ana's screams and follows them to the sewers. During the torture, Ivan reveals that Ana is his stepmother, who herself was raped by her future husband, Ivan's father while Nikolay and Georgy were products of Ana's rapes. Katie understands Ana's sadistic nature and begins to torture Ana and Ivan, but at that moment Kiril arrives and holds his gun up to Katie. Ivan grabs and begins to strangle Katie, but Kiril shoots Ivan in the head, allowing Katie to escape. As Ana, the sole survivor, is arrested by Kiril for her part in her family's crimes, Katie leaves and takes refuge at the U.S. Embassy.

Cast

 Jemma Dallender as Katie Carter
 Yavor Baharov as Georgy Patov
 Joe Absolom as Ivan Patov
 Aleksandar Aleksiev as Nikolay Patov
 Mary Stockley as Ana Patov
 Valentine Pelka as Father Dimov
 Georgi Zlaterev as Detective Kiril
 Peter Silverleaf as Valko
 Michael Dixon as Jayson
 Kacey Barnfield as Sharon
 Dimo Alexiev as Bar patron
 Ivan Ivanov as Pedestrian
 Krasimir Ortakchiev as Policeman

Production
Filming began in Sofia, Bulgaria, in November 2012.

Release
When seen by the British Board of Film Classification in a rough cut form for a video classification, Anchor Bay was informed that 27 cuts were needed to secure an 18 certificate for the film. The film was given a limited theatrical release in the United States on September 20, 2013, followed by an immediate home media release on DVD and Blu-ray on September 24. The uncut version (106 minutes) is available in Region 1 territories while the BBFC "18" version is sold in the UK in Region 2.

In the US, the film was given a theatrical release in only one theater for one week. At the box office, the film made . Internationally, it grossed $587,648 in Russia, $10,485 in Singapore, and $79,662 in Turkey.

Critical response
Critical response to the film was very negative. All eight reviews on the website, Rotten Tomatoes, are negative, resulting in a rating of 0%.  Dennis Harvey of Variety wrote that the film is "exactly the kind of bottom-feeding exploitation trash one expected the last time around". Kim Newman of Screen Daily wrote, "Monroe’s first working-over of this material was at least competent, but this is, at once, too ugly to laugh at and too ridiculous to take seriously."  Annlee Ellingson of the Los Angeles Times wrote that the film starts off promising but degenerates into a "mount of toxic trash".  Serena Whitney of Dread Central rated it 2/5 stars and wrote, "Although the initial premise is frightening and the film is competently shot, I Spit on Your Grave 2 pales in comparison to the original remake."  Pat Torfe of Bloody Disgusting rated it 2.5/5 stars and wrote, "Everything about this film feels like a 'been there, done that' deal, and largely, that's what it is."

Sequel
In March 2015, Anchor Bay Entertainment announced I Spit on Your Grave III: Vengeance Is Mine, the third installment of the film series. Sarah Butler returned to her role as Jennifer Hills and R.D. Braunstein served as director of the film. It was released on DVD and Blu-ray on October 20, 2015.

References

External links
 
 
 

2013 films
2013 horror films
2013 crime thriller films
2010s exploitation films
2013 horror thriller films
2013 independent films
2010s serial killer films
American crime thriller films
American exploitation films
American horror thriller films
American independent films
American sequel films
American serial killer films
Bulgarian-language films
CineTel Films films
Crime horror films
2010s feminist films
Films about kidnapping
Films about brothers
Films about dysfunctional families
Films about violence against women
Films directed by Steven R. Monroe
Films set in Bulgaria
Films set in New York City
Films shot in Bulgaria
American films about revenge
Films shot in New York City
Gang rape in fiction
Incest in film
American rape and revenge films
I Spit on Your Grave (film series)
2010s English-language films
2010s American films